John Michael Fasano (August 24, 1961 – July 19, 2014) was an American screenwriter, film producer and director.

In the length of his career, Fasano directed six films, produced twenty more, and wrote screenplays for at least eighteen others. Fasano spent much of his career working as a script doctor, working on numerous well-known blockbuster films including Tombstone, Die Hard with a Vengeance, and Judge Dredd. With novelist Roni Keller, he also wrote the book Evie and the Golem, published in 2011. A weapons expert, Fasano was a frequent writing contributor to such authoritative magazines as Combat Tactics, and American Handgunner. Fasano was also a prolific Halloween mask designer.

Career
After graduating SUNY College at Purchase in 1984, Fasano used his artistic talents art directing for magazines such as Muscle and Beauty, Race Car & Driver, Wrestling Power and OUI. He also found work painting the one sheet posters for Grindhouse films such as Tenement (Slaughter in the South Bronx) for legendary exploitation film producers Roberta Findlay and Walter Sear.  Fasano rewrote and acted in their film Blood Sisters. His work impressed All in the Sex Family writer-producer-director Jack Bravman, who hired Fasano to write Zombie Nightmare on which Fasano was also an actor and reportedly uncredited co-director, starring Adam West and a young Tia Carrere.

A self-proclaimed metalhead, Fasano drew artwork for concert promotion material and heavy metal magazines, as well as directing the heavy metal-themed cult horror films Rock 'n' Roll Nightmare and Black Roses, the former of which starred Canadian singer Jon Mikl Thor. Fasano relocated to Los Angeles in 1989, where he sold his first spec script, Tailgunner, to Morgan Creek. He then co-wrote the screenplay for Another 48 Hrs. for director Walter Hill, which generated a series of script-writing offers from major studios. Fasano became a script doctor contracted to Cinergi Pictures, making major contributions to the screenplays for numerous films produced by the company, including Die Hard with a Vengeance, Tombstone, Judge Dredd, and Color of Night. Fasano was among the many writers attached to Alien 3 during its long development. While Vincent Ward was still attached to the project, Fasano expanded the writer-director's story outline into a full screenplay that was ultimately unused. In 1997, he was nominated for a WGA Award for writing The Hunchback, a television adaptation of Victor Hugo's novel The Hunchback of Notre-Dame which stylistically hearkened back to the previous 1923 adaptation. He also wrote several episodes of the television series F/X, the made-for-TV film The Hunley, and was a one-off guest writer on Profiler.

Fasano co-wrote Universal Soldier: The Return, a sequel to the original 1992 cult action film. In 2001, Fasano penned the screenplay to Megiddo: The Omega Code 2, a religious thriller film starring Michael York, and produced by the Trinity Broadcasting Network. Two years later, he returned to the horror genre as one of the writers and producers of Darkness Falls, an early outing for director Jonathan Liebesman.

Fasano wrote several television films, including Saving Jessica Lynch and Stone Cold. In 2009, he created Woke Up Dead, a horror comedy web series starring Jon Heder and Wayne Knight. His final outing as director was Kamen Rider: Dragon Knight, a tokusatsu TV series aired on The CW.

Filmography 
 Tenement (Slaughter in the South Bronx) (1985)
 F/X (1986)
 Blood Sisters (1987)
 Rock 'n' Roll Nightmare (1987)
 Zombie Nightmare (1987)
 Black Roses (1988)
 Another 48 Hrs. (1990)
 Tombstone (1993)
 Color of Night (1994)
 Die Hard with a Vengeance (1995)
 The Hunchback (1997)
 The Hunley (1999) 
 Universal Soldier: The Return (1999)
 Profiler (2000)
 Megiddo: The Omega Code 2 (2001) 
 Darkness Falls (2003)
 Murder at the Presidio (2005)
 The Legend of Butch & Sundance (2006)
 A Family Lost (2007)
 Kamen Rider: Dragon Knight (2009)
 Woke Up Dead (2009)
 Hannah's Law (2012)
 Sniper: Legacy (2014)

Death
He died at his home in Los Angeles on July 19, 2014, of heart failure. At the time of his passing, he was in the midst of developing a contemporary remake of Chariots of the Gods.

References

External links 
 

1961 births
2014 deaths
American film directors
American film producers
American screenwriters
American male screenwriters
American television writers
American male television writers